Year 1489 (MCDLXXXIX) was a common year starting on Thursday (link will display the full calendar) of the Julian calendar.

Events 
 January–December 
 March 14 – The Queen of Cyprus, Catherine Cornaro, sells her kingdom to the Republic of Venice.
 March 26 – The Treaty of Medina del Campo between England and Spain includes provision for a marriage between Arthur, the son of King Henry VII of England, and Princess Catherine of Aragon.
June 29 – King James IV grants Andrew, Lord Gray, the lands and Barony of Lundie in Scotland.
 July 17 – Delhi Sultanate: Sikandar Lodi succeeds Bahlul Khan Lodi as sultan.
 November 29 – Arthur Tudor is named Prince of Wales.
 December 11 – Jeannetto de Tassis is appointed Chief Master of Postal Services in Innsbruck; his descendants, the Thurn und Taxis Family, later run much of the postal system of Europe.

 Date unknown 
 Typhus first appears in Europe, during the Siege of Baza in the Granada War.
 A gold coin equal to one pound sterling, called a sovereign, is issued for Henry VII of England.
 King Henry VII of England gives a town charter to the port of Southwold.
 Lucas Watzenrode becomes bishop of Warmia.
 Johannes Widmann publishes his mercantile arithmetic  in Leipzig, containing the first printed use of plus and minus signs, to indicate trading surpluses or shortages.

Births 
 February 9 – Georg Hartmann, German instrument maker (d. 1564)
 June 2 – Charles, Duke of Vendôme, French noble (d. 1537)
 June 4 – Antoine, Duke of Lorraine (d. 1544)
 June 16 – Sibylle of Bavaria, Electress Palatine consort (d. 1519)
 June 23 – Charles II, Duke of Savoy, Italian sovereign (d. 1496)
 July 2 – Thomas Cranmer, Archbishop of Canterbury (d. 1556)
 August – Antonio da Correggio, Italian painter (d. 1534)
 August 10 – Jacob Sturm von Sturmeck, German statesman and reformer (d. 1553)
 November 10 – Henry V, Duke of Brunswick-Lüneburg and Prince of Wolfenbüttel 1514–1568 (d. 1568)
 November 28 – Margaret Tudor, Scottish regent, Queen of James IV of Scotland, daughter of Henry VII of England (d. 1541)
 December 10 – Gaston of Foix, Duke of Nemours (d. 1512)
 date unknown
 Gerónimo de Aguilar, Franciscan friar who participated in the Spanish conquest of Mexico (d. 1531)
 William Farel, French evangelist (d. 1565)
 Francesco Ferruccio, Florentine captain (d. 1530)
 Hosokawa Sumimoto, Japanese warlord (d. 1520)
 Margareta von Melen, Swedish noblewoman (d. 1541)
 Tsukahara Bokuden, Japanese swordsman (d. 1571)
 probable
 Juan de Grijalva, Spanish conquistador (d. 1527)
 Thomas Müntzer, German pastor and rebel leader (d. 1525)

Deaths 
 January 3 – Martin Truchseß von Wetzhausen, Grand Master of the Teutonic Knights (b. 1435)
 February 14 – Nicolaus von Tüngen, bishop of Warmia 
 March 27 – Gilbert Kennedy, 1st Lord Kennedy, Scottish noble (b. 1405)
 April 6 – Jodha of Mandore, Ruler of Marwar (b. 1416)
 April 26 – Ashikaga Yoshihisa, Japanese shōgun (b. 1465)
 April 28 – Henry Percy, 4th Earl of Northumberland (b. c. 1449)
 May 3 – Stanisław Kazimierczyk, Polish canon regular and saint (b. 1433)
 May 21 – Henry V of Rosenberg, Bohemian nobleman (b. 1456)
 July 12 – Bahlul Lodi, sultan of Delhi
 July 19 – Louis I, Count Palatine of Zweibrücken (b. 1424)
 date unknown
 Gerontius, Metropolitan of Moscow, Russian bishop 
 María de Ajofrín, Spanish visionary (b. 1455)
 Girindrawardhana, ruler of Majapahit

References